Bizli is a 2018 Bangladeshi superhero film directed by Iftakar Chowdhury, and produced by Bobstar Films. It stars Bobby as the protagonist and Indian actress Satabdi Roy as the antagonist. The film was released at Janata Cinema Hall in Nilphamari on 30 March 2018, then released countrywide on 13 April 2018. It is the first superhero film in Bangladesh to possess an original script and story line.

Cast 
 Bobby as Bizli 
 Ranojoy Bishnu as Rony
 Satabdi Roy as Dr. Jerina Hassan, Rony’s elder sister
 Ilias Kanchan as Dr. Alam
 Zahid Hasan as Sajjad
 Misha Sawdagor
 Dilara Zaman
 Anisur Rahman Milon
 Tiger Robi
 Shadin Khasru as Driver Habib

Release 
The first look of Bizli was revealed on 15 March 2018. Bizli was released in Sydney Australia on 8 July 2018. Also released in Dublin, London, Luton, and Birmingham.

References

External links

2018 films
2010s superhero films
Bengali-language Bangladeshi films
2010s Bengali-language films
Jaaz Multimedia films